Tongowoko County is one of the 141 Cadastral divisions of New South Wales. It is located in the remote north-west of the state, south of the Queensland border.

The name Tongowoko is believed to be derived from a local Aboriginal word.

Parishes within this county
A full list of parishes found within this county; their current LGA and mapping coordinates to the approximate centre of each location is as follows:

From 2009, the parishes of Tongowoko lie within Division A of the Western Livestock Health and Pest District, along with Evelyn, Farnell, Fitzgerald, Mootwingee, Poole, Tandora, Yantara, and Yungnulgra Counties; some parishes of Killara, Yancowinna, and Young; and with Connulpie and Omura Parishes of Delalah County.

References

External links
 “Map of the County of Tongowoko, Western Division, N.S.W.” Sydney : Department of Lands, [1940] Digitized copy at Trove. Sheet 1, 2.

Counties of New South Wales